Melinis repens is a species of grass known by the common names rose Natal grass, Natal red top, or simply Natal grass. It is native to southern Africa and an introduced species, often considered a noxious weed, on other continents such as North America and Australia. It is an annual or perennial grass, growing up to a meter tall. Its growth rate is dependent on temperature. The inflorescence is an open array of branches bearing spikelets densely coated in silky white or pink. In Chishona, its name is bhurakwacha.

External links
Grass Manual Treatment
Jepson Manual Treatment — invasive plant species in California.
USDA Plants Profile — invasive plant species.
Western Australian Flora — invasive plant species.

Panicoideae
Grasses of Africa
Grasses of South Africa
Flora of Southern Africa